Lorenzo Porciatti  (September 3, 1864 – March 17, 1928) was an Italian architect and architectural restorer, active mainly in his native Tuscany.

Biography
He was born in Cana, and died in Grosseto. He obtained a diploma from the Academy of Fine Arts in Florence, then went to University of Rome to study mathematics, but left after a year. He became self-taught as an architect. He won an award for his design of the altar to Pope Leo XIII. He designed the tomb of Major Daniel Peploe at Weobley, Herefordshire, the Paoletti Perini chapel at the cemetery of Trespiano, and the Salle chapel at San Miniato al Monte, including its painting and sculpture.

He presented a project, presented at the 1887 Exposition of Venice for the restoration and completion of the nave, as well of construction of a pulpit, of the Cathedral of Grosseto. He also designed two monuments to Donatello.

For the town of Montieri, on the ruins of the older Palazzo di Giustizia, Porciatti designed a Gothic Revival Palazzo Comunale (1901) and the elementary school. He also designed the Neo-Gothic Palazzo Aldobrandeschi and Villino Pastorelli, and the Art Nouveau style Villino Panichi in Grosseto. He also helped restore the Castello in Castiglione della Pescaia and designed the Vivarelli Mausoleum in Talamone's cemetery.

References

19th-century Italian architects
20th-century Italian architects
Architects from Tuscany
1864 births
1928 deaths
People from the Province of Grosseto
Art Nouveau architects
Accademia di Belle Arti di Firenze alumni